Leonardo da Vinci: The Mind of the Renaissance (UK title: Leonardo da Vinci: Renaissance Man;) is a 1996 illustrated biography of Leonardo da Vinci authored by the Italian art critic Alessandro Vezzosi, translated from Italian into French by Françoise Liffran, and published by Éditions Gallimard in the same year as the  volume in their "Découvertes" collection (known as "Abrams Discoveries" in the United States, and "New Horizons" in the United Kingdom). The book was adapted into a documentary film in 2001, by the title .

The Italian edition was published by Electa/Gallimard as the  volume in the "Universale Electa/Gallimard" collection, which has a total of 200 pages, whereas the French edition contains only 160 pages. The English translation, however, is based on French text rather than the original Italian, as well as other international editions.

Introduction 

The book is part of the  series (formerly belonging to  series) in the "Découvertes Gallimard" collection. According to the tradition of "Découvertes", which is based on an abundant pictorial documentation and a way of bringing together visual documents and texts, enhanced by printing on coated paper, as commented in L'Express, "genuine monographs, published like art books". It's almost like a "graphic novel", replete with colour plates.

Here the author traces the life and work of Leonardo da Vinci—the artist of —from his childhood in Italy to his death in France, in five chapters, followed by a set of "documents". It is an attempt to rewrite Da Vinci's biography, in multiple dimensions, beyond the aura of myth and mystery, of legend and rhetoric, on the basis of autograph manuscripts and original documents. The book also presents a way to reconsider the interpretation of Da Vinci's work, his interdisciplinary complexity, his "universality" and "modernity".

In addition to the English and French translations, the book has been translated into Brazilian Portuguese, European Spanish, Japanese, Lithuanian, Polish, Romanian, Russian, South Korean, Swedish, Turkish, simplified and traditional Chinese. A new edition was released in 2010, an e-book for iPad came out in 2012, and a reprint for the Leonardo da Vinci exhibition at the Louvre Museum from 24 October 2019 to 24 February 2020.

Contents 
The book opens with a "trailer", that is, a series of full-page drawings, paintings and mural made by Leonardo da Vinci. The body text is divided into five chapters:

 Chapter 1: "Once Upon a Time in Vinci";
 Chapter 2: "In the Florence of the Medici";
 Chapter 3: "In Milan in the Time of the Sforza";
 Chapter 4: "Art and War";
 Chapter 5: "Milan, Rome, Amboise".

The second part of the book, the "Documents", containing a compilation of excerpts divided into five parts:

 Portraits of a mysterious man;
 Freud and Leonardo;
 Leonardo in his own words;
 Leonardo's science;
 Leonardo in the modern age.
 Further Reading;
 List of Illustrations;
 Index.

Reception 
On Babelio, the book gets an average of 4.28/5 based on 9 ratings. Goodreads reported, based on 129 ratings, an average of 3.60 out of 5, indicating "generally positive opinions".

In The Irish Times, an anonymous author opines that "this little book is a useful summary".

Adaptation 
In 2001, the book was adapted into a documentary film by the title . It was broadcast on Arte as part of the television programme The Human Adventure, and also released on DVD by Centre national du cinéma et de l'image animée (CNC). It has been dubbed into German under the title , and into English, by the title Leonardo da Vinci: The Mind of the Renaissance.

See also 
 Renaissance man
 Renaissance art
 Renaissance science

References

External links 
  
 
 

1996 non-fiction books
Works about Leonardo da Vinci
Italian biographies
Biographies about artists
Biographies adapted into films
Découvertes Gallimard
2001 documentary films
French documentary television films
Documentary films about men
Documentary films about painters
2000s French films